Raveena Tandon is an Indian actress known for her work in Hindi films. She made her acting debut in the 1991 action film Patthar Ke Phool, which earned her the Filmfare Award for New Face of the Year. This was followed by a series of unsuccessful films including Ek Hi Raasta (1993) and Parampara (1993 film). In 1994, she appeared in eight Hindi films, most of them were commercial successes. Among these were two of the top-grossing films  the romantic musical drama Dilwale and the action drama Mohra. The success of the latter marked a turning point in her career, establishing Tandon as a leading actress in Hindi cinema. The same year, her performance in the drama Laadla, earned her a nomination for the Filmfare Award for Best Supporting Actress. Her other film was the comedy Andaz Apna Apna, which though initially a box office disappointment, attained cult status over the years.

Tandon subsequently played leading roles in the action thrillers Khiladiyon Ka Khiladi (1996) and Ziddi (1997). Both films were among the highest grossing Bollywood films of their respective years. In 1998, she starred opposite Govinda in the commercially successful comedies Dulhe Raja, and Bade Miyan Chote Miyan. Tandon had five film releases in 1999. While the comedy Anari No.1  was a commercial success, her other four releases that year performed poorly at the box office. Nevertheless, she received praise for her performance in the crime drama Shool.

In the early 2000s, she ventured into more serious dramatic roles and turned towards arthouse cinema. She received critical acclaim for her performances in them. She won the National Film Award for Best Actress for playing a victim of domestic abuse in the 2001 social drama Daman. The same year, her performance in the supernatural thriller Aks won her the Filmfare Special Performance Award. She received further praise for portraying a politician in Madhur Bhandarkar's 2003 drama Satta. Later, she starred on the Sahara One television series Sahib Biwi Gulam, Rituparno Ghosh's adaptation of Bimal Mitra's novel. After her marriage in 2004, she took a break from films, appearing occasionally on television. In 2012, she hosted a talk show titled Issi Ka Naam Zindagi on NDTV.

Films

All films are in Hindi unless otherwise noted.

Television

Web series

Music videos

References

External links
 
 Raveena Tandon on Bollywood Hungama

Indian filmographies
Actress filmographies